The Royal Victorian Eye and Ear Hospital (the Eye and Ear) is a specialist public teaching hospital in East Melbourne, Australia. It is the only hospital in Australia which specialises in both ophthalmology and otolaryngology.

History
The hospital was established as the Eye and Ear Infirmary in 1863, by Andrew Sexton Gray, an Irish medical practitioner who had emigrated to Victoria. Dr Gray founded the infirmary due to the prevalence of eye and ear diseases at the time, particularly amongst miners on the Victorian gold fields, and also due to poor standards of sanitation and hygiene. In 1870, Gray's infirmary merged with Ophthalmic and Orthopaedic Institution operated by Aubrey Bowen and Ewin Jones, and in 1878 the hospital was granted valuable land by the Victorian government in what was called Tank Reserve in East Melbourne. Its new building was completed in 1883.

In 1978, the Eye and Ear was the site of a pioneering operation to install the world's first multi-channel cochlear implant (Bionic Ear), developed by Graeme Clark. Professor Clark subsequently established the Bionic Ear Institute at the hospital, and one of the laneways through the hospital site was named Bionic Ear Lane to commemorate the research and development by Clark and his team.

Statistics
, the RVEEH has 30 inpatient beds and a 10-bed Medihotel. In one year, the hospital treats about 180,000 outpatients, admits about 13,000 inpatients, and performs around 14,000 surgeries. The Emergency Department operates 24 hours a day, and handles around 47,000 presentations a year of which approximately 80 per cent are ophthalmology (eye) cases.

Geography and redevelopment
The hospital comprises three wings: the Aubrey Bowen Wing (built in 1896), the Peter Howson Wing (built in 1974) and the Smorgon Family Wing (commissioned in 1987). There is a tunnel underneath Victoria Parade which links the Eye and Ear to St Vincent's Hospital.

In November 2012, the Victorian Government announced that the hospital would undergo a  redevelopment, due to be completed in 2018.

In 2021 it began the implementation of a digitisation project designed to improve the way it manages clinic appointments with patient self check-in kiosks and digital display screens to communicate information and waiting times to patients.

References

External links

Hospitals in Melbourne
Teaching hospitals in Australia
Hospitals established in 1863
1863 establishments in Australia
Eye hospitals
Organisations based in Australia with royal patronage
Eye care in Australia
East Melbourne, Victoria
Buildings and structures in the City of Melbourne (LGA)